Mary Whyte (born 1953 in Cleveland, Ohio) is an American watercolor artist, a traditionalist preferring a representational style, and the author of seven published books, who has earned awards for her large-scale watercolors.  In 2016, the Portrait Society of America chose Whyte as the 2016 recipient of the Society’s Gold Medal, their highest honor. In 2013, Whyte was awarded by the state of South Carolina, the South Carolina Governor’s Award for the Arts; the highest honor given to an artist in South Carolina. Whyte was recognized in 2020 by the National Society of the Daughters of the American Revolution with two DAR awards: the Medal of Honor, and the Women in the Arts Recognition Award.  In 2021, Whyte received an Honorary Doctorate Degree from Converse University in Spartanburg, South Carolina.  Also in 2021, Whyte was awarded the Lifetime Achievement Award from Fine Art Connoisseur.

Whyte presents her large-scale watercolor portraits in museum exhibitions throughout the United States and internationally.  Most recently, WE THE PEOPLE: Portraits of Veterans in America exhibition, of 50 paintings - one veteran portrait representing each state, opened in 2019 and is traveling through 2022.  "Mary Whyte's WE THE PEOPLE is a moving and important tribute to our nation's greatest patriots - the men and women who served our country with courage, selflessness, and hornor."  Major General James E. Livingston, Medal of Honor Recipient

Whyte's Working South exhibition of 50 paintings of people working in vanishing industries throughout the southern United States, toured for four years. "Mary Whyte is the artist of record of a changing world... a world she's captured in a style all her own," says CBS News. In Whyte’s Working South exhibition that aired on CBS Sunday Morning, Whyte proclaimed about her work: "Getting a likeness is the easy part, making a good painting that endures, that speaks forever is the difficult part."

Whyte's works are included in corporate, university, private, and museum collections, and has exhibited nationally including the Greenville County Museum of Art, Butler Institute of American Art, Gibbes Museum of Art, The Salmagundi Club, National Arts Club, Mennello Museum of American Art, Telfair Museums, Morris Museum of Art, Fred & Pamela Buffett Cancer Center and internationally in the China and Foreign Countries International Watercolour Summit at the Nanning Art Gallery in Nanning China, and Thailand in the World Watermedia Exposition.

Mary Whyte has a private stuldio in South Carolina.  She married Arnold Nemirow in 2020.

Published works
 We The People, University of South Carolina Press, 2019 
 Down Bohicket Road,  University of South Carolina Press, 2012 
 Working South,  University of South Carolina Press, 2011 
 Painting Portraits and Figures in Watercolor,  Watson-Guptill, 2011 
 An Artist’s Way of Seeing,  Gibbs Smith, 2005 
Alfreda’s World,  Wyrick and Company, 2003 
 Watercolor for the Serious Beginner,  Watson-Guptill, 1997

Selected bibliography

 Martha R. Severens|Severens, Martha R. (2013). More Than a Likeness: The Enduring Art of Mary Whyte. South Carolina: University of South Carolina Press

References

Living people
Realist artists
American watercolorists
1953 births